The 2022–23 Supercopa de España Femenina was the fourth edition of the current Supercopa de España Femenina, an annual women's football competition for clubs in the Spanish football league system that were successful in its major competitions in the preceding season.

Barcelona defended the title after defeating Real Sociedad 3–0 in the final, to win the competition for a record third time.

Draw 
The draw for the competition was held on 21 December 2022. On 15 January, the referees María Dolores Martínez Madrona and Marta Huerta de Aza were chosen to officiate in the semi-finals. The final took place at Estadio Romano in Mérida on 22 January 2023, and was officiated by referee Marta Frías Acedo.

Qualification 
The competition featured both finalists of the 2021–22 Copa de la Reina, as well as the next two highest-ranked clubs at the 2021–22 Primera División that had not already qualified through the cup final.

Qualified teams 
The following four teams qualified for the tournament.

Matches

Bracket

Semi-finals

Final

See also 
 2022–23 Liga F
 2022–23 Copa de la Reina

References 

2022–23 in Spanish football cups
2022